Mischa Bredewold (born 20 June 2000) is a Dutch professional racing cyclist, who currently rides for UCI Women's Continental Team Parkhotel Valkenburg.

Starting racing in 2017 as a junior, the early part of her career was heavily disrupted when she was hit by a truck while training for the Dutch junior team prior to the 2018 UCI Road World Championships. Despite three broken vertebrae, six broken ribs, a broken pelvis, and a serious brain injury - Bredewold made a full recovery, and joined the professional peloton in 2020 with NXTG Racing. 

Signing for Parkhotel Valkenburg for the 2021 season, her best result of the year was the young riders classification at the Baloise Ladies Tour, with three other top 5 finishes in the young riders classifications at other races. 

In 2022, she finished 3rd in the under 23 category at the Dutch National Time Trial Championships, as well as 3rd in the under 23 category European Road Championships Mixed Relay Team Time Trial. In her first Grand Tour, Bredewold came second in the young riders classification at the Tour de France Femmes, five minutes behind Shirin van Anrooij. She finished the race 21st overall. Bredewold then won the À travers les Hauts-de-France later that year.

In September 2022, it was announced that both Bredewold and Femke Markus would join SD Worx from 2023, signing a two year deal.

Major Results 
2021
 1st  young rider classification Baloise Ladies Tour (4th overall)
 2nd young rider classification Holland Ladies Tour
2022
 1st À travers les Hauts-de-France
 1st  young rider classification Holland Ladies Tour
 1st, stage 6 Holland Ladies Tour 
 2nd young rider classification Tour de France Femmes
 3rd U23 European Road Championships Mixed Relay Team Time Trial
 3rd U23 Dutch National Time Trial Championships

References

External links 
 Mischa Bredewold at ProCyclingStats
 Mischa Bredewold at Cycling Archives

Living people
2000 births
Dutch female cyclists
Sportspeople from Amersfoort
Cyclists from Utrecht (province)
21st-century Dutch women